Walker Lake is an unincorporated town and census-designated place in Mineral County, Nevada, United States. As of the 2010 census, the population of Walker Lake was 275.

Geography
The Walker Lake CDP is located in western Mineral County, Nevada, along the west shore and overlooking Walker Lake. Walker Lake State Recreation Area is located immediately north of the CDP.

Demographics

References

Census-designated places in Mineral County, Nevada
Census-designated places in Nevada